Wilfredo Beltran Alicdan (born February 22, 1965 in Dasmariñas, Cavite) is a Filipino figurative artist. His works are distinguished by their quaint and geometric folk representations, populated by rounded stylized figures usually engaged in traditional and rural activities.

His early works are simplistic, with flat colors and sparse details, funny, and often depicting family life which he draws from his childhood memories as the older brother of seven younger siblings.

Education 
Alicdan graduated elementary school in 1978 from Francisco E. Barzaga Memorial School in Dasmariñas. He graduated high school from Immaculate Conception Academy in 1982 with a gold medal for "Artist of the Year" award. He studied fine arts in the Philippine Women's University from 1983 to 1986.

Career 
Alicdan is a member of the Anting-Anting, a group of artists from Cavite.

In 1989, Alicdan participated in the Metrobank Painting Competition and was an honorable mention. In 1996, he participated in the Art Association of the Philippines (AAP) Annual Art Competition. In 2003, he represented the Philippines in RENGA (Linked-Image) Project.

Some of Alicdan's works are displayed in various places in his hometown of Dasmariñas, including the DASCA Building.

Solo exhibitions 
Alicdan has had multiple solo exhibitions in the Philippines and Singapore.

 1992 – Buhay Pinoy, Gallery Genesis, Manila, Philippines
 1993 – Sandosenang Eksena, Ayala Museum, Makati, Philippines
 1994 – Sa Paglipad ng mga Lobo, Cultural Center of the Philippines, Manila, Philippines
 1995 – Paskong Paksiw, Ayala Museum, Makati, Philippines
 1999 – Giliw, Ayala Museum, Makati, Philippines
 2002 – Paradeisos, Liongoren Gallery, Cubao, Quezon City, Philippines
 2003 – In My Quiet Room, Red Dot Gallery, Makati, Philippines
 2007 – Relish, Blueline Gallery, Rustans, Makati, Philippines
 2008 – Random Delight, Art Verite Gallery, Serendra, Bonifacio Global City, Taguig, Philippines
 2008 – Fruition, Art Space, Royal Plaza on Scotts, Singapore
 2009 – Cloud Nine, Art Space, Royal Plaza on Scotts, Singapore
 2012 – Unplugged Ceremony, Galerie Anna, SM Megamall, Ortigas, Mandaluyong, Philippines
 2013 – The Wall of Values, Museo de La Salle, De La Salle University, Dasmariñas, Philippines
 2013 – Indissoluble, Art Elements Asian Gallery, SM Aura Premier, Bonifacio Global City, Taguig, Philippines
 2018 – Joie de Vivre, Charlie's Art Gallery, Bacolod, Philippines
 2020 – Detour, Secret Fresh Gallery, San Juan, Philippines

Group exhibitions 
Alicdan also has had multiple group exhibitions with his group, Anting-Anting, and also with various other artists in different cities around the world.
 1990 – Pilipino Portfolio, Fort Mason Center for Arts & Culture, San Francisco, California, United States
 2000 – Kasama (Wilfredo Alicdan–Emmanuel Garibay Two-Man Show), Galeriasia, Hong Kong
 2000 – Sa Aming Bakuran, Vargas Museum, University of the Philippines Diliman, Quezon City, Philippines
 2001 – Anting-Anting sa MAC, Madrigal Art Center, Alabang, Muntinlupa, Philippines
 2002 – Anting-Anting Exhibition, Cultural Center of the Philippines, Pasay, Philippines
 2002 - Anting-Anting Exhibition, Museo de La Salle, De La Salle University, Dasmariñas, Philippines
 2003 – Ubod, Boston Gallery, Cubao, Quezon City, Philippines
 2003 – Dencities, Cultural Center of the Philippines, Pasay, Philippines
 2003 – Surrounded by Anting-Anting, Surrounded by Water Alternative Space, Cubao, Quezon City, Philippines
 2004 – Matahati / Anting-Anting Exhibition, National Visual Arts Gallery, Kuala Lumpur, Malaysia
 2005 – Anting-Anting / Matahati Exhibition, Pinto Art Gallery, Antipolo, Philippines
 2005 – Sulyap, Sentro Oftalmologico, Philippine General Hospital, Manila, Philippines
 2005 – Gallery Night, Abode Gallery, Providence, Rhode Island, United States
 2006 – Beyond Borders, Substation Gallery, Singapore
 2006 – Emerging Fires, Taksu Gallery, Kuala Lumpur, Malaysia
 2006–07 – Through the Palette's Eye, De La Salle University, Manila, Philippines; Jorge B. Vargas Museum and Filipiniana Research Center, University of the Philippines Diliman, Quezon City, Philippines; University of Santo Tomas, Manila; Cultural Center of the Philippines, Manila, Philippines
 2006 – Anting Anting Exhibition, ArtExchange Gallery, Makati, Philippines
 2006 – Tipon, Metropolitan Museum, Pasay, Philippines
 2007 – Convergence: Faces of Filipino Contemporary Art, Art Space, Royal Plaza on Scotts, Singapore
 2007 – Playful Moods (Wilfredo Alicdan–Allan Balisi Two-Man Show), Art Space, Royal Plaza on Scotts, Singapore
 2007 – Tiga Seni, Sokka Gakai Building, Kuala Lumpur, Malaysia
 2008 – Art40, Pinto Art Gallery, Antipolo, Philippines
 2008 – Love Story, PhilAm Life Lobby, UN Avenue, Manila, Philippines
 2008 – Bisperas, Art Verite Gallery, Serendra, Bonifacio Global City, Taguig, Philippines
 2009 – Convergence (A Three-Man Show by Deise Dias Cavalheiro, Wilfredo Alicdan, and Anne Severyns), Art Space, Royal Plaza on Scotts, Singapore
 2009 – Salvation History (Part 1, Anting-Anting 10th Anniversary Show), Tin-aw Art Gallery, Makati, Philippines
 2010 – Saving the Land (Part 2, Anting-Anting 10th Anniversary Show), Art Verite Gallery, Makati, Philippines
 2010 – Eternal Damn Nation (Part 3, Anting-Anting 10th Anniversary Show), Manila Contemporary, Manila, Philippines
 2012 – India Art Festival, Studio 3, MMRDA Grounds, Bandra Kurla Complex, Mumbai, India
 2012 – ArtsGoogle 2012, AKR Fusion Gallery, Fort Worth, Texas, United States
 2013 – Ni Hao, Galerie Anna, SM Megamall, Ortigas, Mandaluyong, Philippines
 2015 – Iskwalado, Galerie Anna, SM Megamall, Ortigas, Mandaluyong, Philippines
 2017 – Pamana, Museo de La Salle, De La Salle University, Dasmariñas, Philippines
 2018 – World Art Dubai 2018, Za'abeel Hall 3, Dubai World Trade Center, Dubai, United Arab Emirates

Advocacy 
Alicdan supports UNICEF which reproduces his art works as greeting cards for the benefit of children around the world.

In 2017, he participated in Art and Advocacy, an art auction for B-Aware, a Hepatitis B awareness campaign by the Hepatology Society of the Philippines.

Awards 

Alicdan was a finalist at the 1992 Philippine Art Awards in Makati. In 2007, he was awarded the 5th General Emilio Aguinaldo Outstanding Achievement Award for Visual Arts in Tagaytay.

Personal life 
Alicdan is the oldest of eight children. He is married. He speaks English and Filipino.

References

External links 
 Wilfredo Alicdan's Paintings on Pinterest

20th-century Filipino painters
21st-century Filipino painters
Artists from Cavite
1965 births
Living people
People from Dasmariñas
Philippine Women's University alumni